Miguel Sadot Sánchez Carreño (born 29 September 1948) is a Mexican politician affiliated with the Institutional Revolutionary Party. As of 2014 he served as Senator of the LVIII and LIX Legislatures of the Mexican Congress representing Oaxaca.

References

1948 births
Living people
People from Oaxaca City
Members of the Senate of the Republic (Mexico)
Institutional Revolutionary Party politicians
21st-century Mexican politicians